Kim Thuy may refer to:

Kim Thủy, a village in the Lệ Thủy District of Vietnam
Kim Thúy (born 1968), Vietnamese-born Canadian writer